Harichandanpur railway station is a railway station on the East Coast Railway network in the state of Odisha, India. It serves Harichandanpur village. Its code is HCNR. It has two platforms. Express trains halt at Harichandanpur railway station.

Major trains

 Puri–Barbil Express
 Visakhapatnam–Tatanagar Weekly Superfast Express
Kendujhargarh – Khurda Road Express

See also
 Kendujhar district

References

Railway stations in Kendujhar district
Khurda Road railway division